A  school of thought, or intellectual tradition, is the perspective of a group of people who share common characteristics of opinion or outlook of a philosophy, discipline, belief, social movement, economics, cultural movement, or art movement.

History
The phrase has become a common colloquialism which is used to describe those that think alike or those that focus on a common idea. The term's use is common place.

Schools are often characterized by their currency, and thus classified into "new" and "old" schools. There is a convention, in political and philosophical fields of thought, to have  "modern" and "classical" schools of thought. An example is the modern and classical liberals. This dichotomy is often a component of paradigm shift. However, it is rarely the case that there are only two schools in any given field.

Schools are often named after their founders such as the "Rinzai school" of Zen, named after Linji Yixuan; and the Asharite school of early Muslim philosophy, named after Abu l'Hasan al-Ashari. They are often also named after their places of origin, such as the Ionian school of philosophy, which originated in Ionia; the Chicago school of architecture, which originated in Chicago, Illinois; the Prague school of linguistics, named after a linguistic circle founded in Prague; and the Tartu–Moscow Semiotic School, whose representatives lived in Tartu and Moscow.

An example of a school of thought in Christianity (and Gnosticism) is Neoplatonism, which has massively influenced Christian thought, from Augustinianism to Renaissance/Humanism to the present day.

See also
 Commentary of a philosophical text
 List of philosophies
 Mindset
 Paradigm
 Philosophical movement
 Worldview

References

 
Colloquial terms
Category